Klosterskogen Travbane is a harness racing track located at Klosterskogen in Skien, Norway. Owned by Norwegian Trotting Association, its tote betting is handled by Norsk Rikstoto.

Notable races
 Klosterskogen Grand Prix
 Moe Odins Æresløp
 Thai Tanics Æresløp
 Prince Royals Minneløp
 Habibs Minneløp

References

External links
 Official website

Sports venues in Skien
Harness racing venues in Norway